The Leather Archives & Museum (LA&M) is a community archives, library, and museum located in the Rogers Park neighborhood of Chicago. Founded by Chuck Renslow and Tony DeBlase in 1991, its mission is "making leather, kink, BDSM, and fetish accessible through research, preservation, education and community engagement." The LA&M is a leading conservator of queer erotic art. Its permanent collection features some of the most iconic LGBT artists of the twentieth century, including the complete works of Bill Schmeling and many of Dom Orejudos' drawings and murals. 

The LA&M is a 501(c)(3)-registered non-profit organization. In addition to its activities in Chicago, the LA&M sends traveling exhibits around the country, and provides email and telephone research assistance.

Permanent exhibits
The permanent exhibits at the LA&M are the Fakir Musafar exhibit, the Dungeon exhibit (which shows some of the museum's artifacts in an erotic environment), the Leatherbar exhibit, and the A Room of Her Own exhibit (about women's leather history).

In regard to the name of the A Room of Her Own exhibit, curator Alex Warner has written,As I began work for the first exhibit installation of the Women's Leather History Project, I was excited that we were both literally and figuratively making room for Leatherwomen's history in the LA&M. It was out of this line of thinking that "A Room of Her Own" emerged, building on Virginia Woolf's 1929 feminist text [A Room of One's Own] that argues for women’s need for space to think and create.

Etienne Auditorium
The LA&M has the Etienne Auditorium, which is used for the LA&M film series, Cinekink, the German Fetisch Film Festival, leather-related contests, demonstrations, community meetings, lectures, and as a place where leather groups and clubs can gather for free.

The auditorium has numerous murals done by Dom Orejudos, who used the pseudonym Etienne, the French equivalent of his middle name Stephen.

Collection
The LA&M has the world's biggest collection of original pieces by Dom Orejudos under the name Etienne, some Touko Valio Laaksonen (who used the pseudonym Tom of Finland) originals, and complete sets of the magazines Drummer (before its relaunch) and Bound & Gagged. It also has one of three original leather pride flags which the flag's creator Tony DeBlase assembled as a prototype, and all of the artwork, notes, and other materials of Bill Schmeling.

The LA&M has notable writings such as the records of International Mr. Leather, National Leather Association, and the Mineshaft, and the papers of Tony DeBlase. Hundreds of oral history recordings, videos and transcripts are also available to researchers.

It also has all photos by Kris Studios, a male physique photography studio founded by Chuck Renslow and Dom Orejudos, that took photos for gay magazines they published. The studio was named in part to honor transgender pioneer Christine Jorgensen. Renslow later co-founded the LA&M with Tony DeBlase.

History
In August 1991, the LA&M was incorporated in the State of Illinois.

Tony DeBlase served as Vice President of the Board of Directors of the LA&M from 1992 until 2000.

The LA&M moved to its current location in 1999. The site was previously home to a synagogue.

In May 2006, the LA&M's executive director Rick Storer participated in a panel discussion entitled "Censorship & Sexually Explicit Materials" at the 2006 GLBT ALMS (Archives, Libraries, Museums and Special Collections) Conference.

In May 2009, the LA&M announced that International Mr. Leather proceeds would be placed in a trust to benefit the museum.

In 2009, the LA&M acquired the 25-box collection of papers of Robert Davolt, author and organizer of the San Francisco Pride leather contingent, and the editor of Bound & Gagged.

In July 2019, Bill Schmeling donated all of his artwork, notes, and other materials to the LA&M, shortly before he died in September.

Honors
The LA&M received the Large Nonprofit Organization of the Year award as part of the Pantheon of Leather Awards in 1997, 2001, 2006, and 2011.

Joseph Bean, while executive director of the LA&M, received the Man of the Year award as part of the Pantheon of Leather Awards in 1998 and 2000, and the Steve Maidhof Award for National or International Work from the National Leather Association International in 1998.

Rick Storer, while executive director of the LA&M, received the President's Award as part of the Pantheon of Leather Awards in 2005, the Man of the Year award as part of the Pantheon of Leather Awards in 2008, the Mr. Marcus Hernandez Lifetime Achievement Award (Man) as part of the Pantheon of Leather Awards in 2012, and the National Leather Association International Lifetime Achievement Award in 2015.

The LA&M received the International Deaf Leather Recognition Award in 2011.

The LA&M was inducted into the Chicago LGBT Hall of Fame in 2017.

The LA&M was inducted into the Leather Hall of Fame in 2019.

Other
Chuck Renslow, who died in 2017, is listed as the Chairman In Memoriam of the LA&M. The LA&M also gives out the Chuck Renslow President's Award to honor individuals and organizations for their contributions to it.

Sources

External links
 

Archives in the United States
BDSM organizations
Leather museums
Leather subculture
LGBT culture in Chicago
LGBT museums and archives
Museums in Chicago
Sex museums in the United States
Inductees of the Chicago LGBT Hall of Fame